This is a list of law enforcement agencies in the state of Arkansas.

According to the US Bureau of Justice Statistics' 2008 Census of State and Local Law Enforcement Agencies, the state had 237 law enforcement agencies employing 6,779 sworn police officers, about 236 for each 100,000 residents.

State agencies 
 Arkansas Department of Public Safety
 Arkansas Alcohol Beverage Control Enforcement
 Arkansas Department of Community Corrections
 Arkansas Department of Correction
 Arkansas Forestry Commission
 Arkansas Game and Fish Commission
 Arkansas Highway Police
 Arkansas Law Enforcement Commission on Standards and Training
 Arkansas Law Enforcement Training Academy
 Arkansas State Capitol Police
 Arkansas State Crime Laboratory
 Arkansas State Forestry Commission Rangers
 Arkansas State Hospital Police
 Arkansas State Park Rangers
 Arkansas State Parole and Probation
 Arkansas State Police
 Arkansas Supreme Court Police
 Arkansas Tobacco Control Board Enforcement
 Arkansas Crime Information Center
 Arkansas Insurance Department(Criminal Investigations)

County agencies 

 Arkansas County Sheriff's Office
 Ashley County Sheriff's Office
 Baxter County Sheriff's Office
 Benton County Sheriff's Office
 Boone County Sheriff's Office
 Bradley County Sheriff's Office
 Calhoun County Sheriff's Office
 Carroll County Sheriff's Office
 Chicot County Sheriff's Office
 Clark County Sheriff's Office
 Clay County Sheriff's Office
 Cleburne County Sheriff's Office
 Cleveland County Sheriff's Office
 Columbia County Sheriff's Office
 Conway County Sheriff's Office
 Craighead County Sheriff's Office
 Crawford County Sheriff's Office
 Crittenden County Sheriff's Office
 Cross County Sheriff's Office
 Dallas County Sheriff's Office
 Desha County Sheriff's Office
 Drew County Sheriff's Office
 Faulkner County Sheriff's Office
 Franklin County Sheriff's Office
 Fulton County Sheriff's Office

 Garland County Sheriff's Office
 Grant County Sheriff's Office
 Greene County Sheriff's Office
 Hempstead County Sheriff's Office
 Hot Spring County Sheriff's Office
 Howard County Sheriff's Office
 Independence County Sheriff's Office
 Izard County Sheriff's Office
 Jackson County Sheriff's Office
 Jefferson County Sheriff's Office
 Johnson County Sheriff's Office
 Lafayette County Sheriff's Office
 Lawrence County Sheriff's Office
 Lee County Sheriff's Office
 Lincoln County Sheriff's Office
 Little River County Sheriff's Office
 Logan County Sheriff's Office
 Lonoke County Sheriff's Office
 Madison County Sheriff's Office
 Marion County Sheriff's Office
 Miller County Sheriff's Office
 Mississippi County Sheriff's Office
 Monroe County Sheriff's Office
 Montgomery County Sheriff's Office
 Nevada County Sheriff's Office

 Newton County Sheriff's Office
 Ouachita County Sheriff's Office
 Perry County Sheriff's Office
 Phillips County Sheriff's Office
 Pike County Sheriff's Office
 Poinsett County Sheriff's Office
 Polk County Sheriff's Office
 Pope County Sheriff's Office
 Prairie County Sheriff's Office
 Pulaski County Sheriff's Office
 Randolph County Sheriff's Office
 Saint Francis County Sheriff's Office
 Saline County Sheriff's Office
 Scott County Sheriff's Office
 Searcy County Sheriff's Office
 Sebastian County Sheriff's Office
 Sevier County Sheriff's Office
 Sharp County Sheriff's Office
 Stone County Sheriff's Office
 Union County Sheriff's Office
 Van Buren County Sheriff's Office
 Washington County Sheriff's Office
 White County Sheriff's Office
 Woodruff County Sheriff's Office
 Yell County Sheriff's Office

City agencies 

 Alexander Police Department
 Alma Police Department
 Altheimer Police Department 
 Altus Police Department 
 Amity Police Department 
 Arkadelphia Police Department
 Ash Flat Police Department
 Ashdown Police Department 
 Atkins Police Department 
 Augusta Police Department
 Austin Police Department
 Bald Knob Police Department
 Barling Police Department 
 Bauxite Police Department
 Bay Police Department
 Bearden Police Department
 Beebe Police Department
 Bella Vista Police Department
 Benton Police Department
 Bentonville Police Department
 Black Rock Police Department
 Blytheville Police Department
 Bono Police Department
 Booneville Police Department
 Bradford Police Department
 Bradley Police Department
 Brinkley Police Department
 Bryant Police Department
 Bull Shoals Police Department
 Cabot Police Department
 Calion Police Department
 Camden Police Department
 Cammack Village Police Department
 Camp Robinson Police Department
 Caraway Police Department
 Carlisle Police Department
 Cave City Police Department
 Cave Springs Police Department
Cedarville Police Department
 Centerton Police Department
 Charleston Police Department
 Cherokee Village Police Department
 Cherry Valley Police Department
 Chidester Police Department
 Clarendon Police Department
 Clarksville Police Department
 Clinton Police Department
 Coal Hill Police Department
Concord Police Department
 Conway Police Department
 Corning Police Department
 Cotter Police Department
 Cotton Plant Police Department
 Crossett Police Department
Damascus Police Department
 Danville Police Department
 Dardanelle Police Department
 De Queen Police Department
 De Witt Police Department
 Decatur Police Department
Dell Police Department
 Dermott Police Department
 Des Arc Police Department
 Diamond City Police Department
Diamondhead Police Department
 Diaz Police Department
 Dierks Police Department
 Dover Marshal's Office
 Dumas Police Department
 Earle Police Department
 East Camden Police Department
 El Dorado Police Department
 Elaine Police Department
 Elkins Police Department
 England Police Department
 Eudora Police Department
 Eureka Springs Police Department
 Fairfield Bay Police Department
 Farmington Police Department
 Fayetteville Police Department
 Flippin Police Department
 Fordyce Police Department
 Forrest City Police Department

 Fort Smith Police Department
 Fouke Police Department
 Gassville Police Department
 Gentry Police Department
 Gillett Police Department
 Glenwood Police Department
 Gosnell Police Department
 Gould Police Department
 Grady Police Department
 Grannis Police Department
 Gravette Police Department
 Green Forest Police Department
 Greenbrier Police Department
 Greenland Police Department
 Greenwood Police Department
 Greers Ferry Police Department
 Gurdon Police Department
 Guy Police Department
 Hackett Police Department
 Hamburg Police Department
 Hampton Police Department
 Hardy Police Department
 Harrisburg Police Department
 Harrison Police Department
 Haskell Police Department
 Hazen City Marhsal's Office
 Heber Springs Police Department
 Helena-West Helena Police Department
 Hermitage Police Department
Higginson Police Department
Highfill Police Department
Highland Police Department
 Holly Grove Police Department
 Hope Police Department
 Horseshoe Bend Police Department
 Hot Springs Police Department
 Hot Springs Village Police Department
 Hoxie Police Department
 Hughes Police Department
 Humphrey Police Department
Huntington Police Department
 Huntsville Police Department
 Huttig Police Department
 Jacksonville Police Department
Jasper Police Department
 Johnson Police Department
 Jonesboro Police Department
 Judsonia Police Department
 Junction City Police Department
 Keiser Police Department
 Kensett Police Department
Kibler Police Department
 Lake City Police Department
 Lake Village Police Department
 Lakeview Police Department
 Lamar Police Department
 Lavaca Police Department
 Leachville Police Department
 Lepanto Police Department
 Lincoln Police Department
Little Flock Police Department
 Little Rock Police Department
 London Police Department 
 Lonoke Police Department
 Lowell Police Department
 Luxora Police Department 
 Madison Police Department 
 Magazine Police Department 
 Magnolia Police Department
 Malvern Police Department
 Manila Police Department
 Mansfield Police Department
 Marianna Police Department
 Marion Police Department
 Marked Tree Police Department
 Marmaduke Police Department
 Marshall Police Department
 Marvell Police Department
 Maumelle Police Department
 Mayflower Police Department
 McCrory Police Department
 McGehee Police Department
 McRae Police Department
 Mena Police Department

 Menifee Police Department
 Mineral Springs Police Department
 Monette Police Department
 Monticello Police Department
 Morrilton Police Department
 Mountain Home Police Department
 Mountain View Police Department
 Mountainburg Police Department
 Mulberry Police Department
 Murfreesboro Police Department
 Nashville Police Department
 Newport Police Department
 Norphlet Police Department
 North Little Rock Police Department
Oak Grove Heights Police Department
 Ola Police Department
Oppelo Police Department
 Osceola Police Department
 Ozark Police Department
 Palestine Police Department
 Pangburn Police Department
 Paragould Police Department
 Paris Police Department
Patterson Police Department
 Pea Ridge Police Department
 Perryville Police Department
 Piggott Police Department
 Pine Bluff Police Department
Plainview Police Department
 Plumerville Police Department
 Pocahontas Police Department
 Portland Police Department
 Pottsville Police Department
 Prairie Grove Police Department
 Prescott Police Department
 Quitman Police Department
 Rector Police Department
 Redfield Police Department
 Rison Police Department
 Rockport Police Department
 Rogers Police Department
 Rose Bud Police Department
 Russellville Police Department
 Salem Police Department
 Searcy Police Department
 Shannon Hills Police Department
 Sheridan Police Department
 Sherwood Police Department
 Siloam Springs Police Department
 Smackover Police Department
 Springdale Police Department
 Stamps Police Department
 Star City Police Department
 Stephens Police Department
 Strong Police Department
 Stuttgart Police Department
 Sulphur Springs Police Department
 Swifton Police Department
 Taylor Police Department
 Texarkana Police Department
 Tontitown Police Department
 Trumann Police Department
 Tuckerman Police Department
 Turrell Police Department
 Tyronza Police Department
 Van Buren Police Department
 Vilonia Police Department
 Waldo Police Department
 Waldron Police Department
 Walnut Ridge Police Department
 Ward Police Department
 Warren Police Department
 Weiner Police Department
 West Fork Police Department
 West Memphis Police Department
 Wheatley City Marshal's Office
 White Hall Police Department
 Widener Police Department
 Wilmot Police Department
Winchester Marshal's Office
 Wynne Police Department

College and university agencies 
 Arkansas State University Police
 Arkansas Tech University Department of Public Safety
 Black River Technical College Police
 Henderson State University Police
 Northwest Arkansas Community College Police
 North Arkansas College Police
 Southern Arkansas University Police Department
 University of Arkansas at Fayetteville Police Department
 University of Arkansas at Little Rock Police Department
 University of Arkansas for Medical Sciences Police Department
 University of Arkansas at Fort Smith Police Department
 University of Arkansas at Morrilton Police Department
 University of Arkansas at Monticello Department of Public Safety
 University of Arkansas at Pine Bluff Police Department
 University of Central Arkansas Police Department

Other agencies 
 Camp Robinson Department of Public Safety
 Fort Chaffee Department of Public Safety
 Office of the United States Marshal for the Eastern District of Arkansas
 Office of the United States Marshal for the Western District of Arkansas
 188th Air National Guard Police
 Union Pacific Railroad Police Department
 Kansas City Southern Railway Police
 United States Department of Veterans Affairs Police

Defunct Agencies 

 Alicia Police Department
Amagon Police Department
Bethel Heights Police Department
Biggers Police Department
Caldwell Marshal's Office
College City Marshal's Office
Colt Police Department
Edmondson Police Department
Fisher Police Department
Foreman Marshal's Office
Grubbs Police Department
Haynes Police Department
Hickory Ridge Police Department
Jacksonport Police Department
Joiner Police Department
Kingsland Marshal's Office
Maynard Police Department
Mt. Ida Police Department
Newark Police Department
Parkin Police Department
Portia Police Department
Reyno Police Department
Sulphur Rock Marshal's Office
Summit Police Department
Waldenburg Police Department
Yellville Police Department

References

Arkansas
Law enforcement agencies
Law enforcement agencies of Arkansas